Denis Yaskovich (born 30 August 1995) is a Belarusian professional footballer who plays for Minsk.

He is a son of former Belarus international footballer Syarhey Yaskovich.

References

External links 
 
 

1995 births
Living people
Belarusian footballers
Association football defenders
FC BATE Borisov players
FC Dinamo Minsk players
FC Bereza-2010 players
FC Slavia Mozyr players
FC Energetik-BGU Minsk players
FC Torpedo-BelAZ Zhodino players
FC Gorodeya players
FC Krumkachy Minsk players
FC Minsk players